Patrick K. Doughty is an American public address announcer for the National Basketball Association (NBA)'s Charlotte Hornets.

Doughty, a native of Pocomoke City, Maryland, also served as the arena voice for Hawk basketball games at the University of Maryland Eastern Shore from 2000 to 2004.

References

External links
 Charlotte Hornets Staff Directory
 Doughty article and picture

Living people
American sports announcers
Charlotte Hornets
National Basketball Association public address announcers
Year of birth missing (living people)
People from Pocomoke City, Maryland